Crystal Key 2, known in Europe as Evany: Key to a Distant Land, is a 2004 graphic adventure game developed by Canadian studio Earthlight Productions, together with Kheops Studio. It was published by The Adventure Company, and is the sequel to the 1999 title The Crystal Key.

Gameplay and plot
Crystal Key 2s plot builds upon that of the original, and casts the player as Call, who seeks to stop the minions of Ozgar and save the world of Evany.

Development
Crystal Key 2 was revealed by DreamCatcher Interactive's Adventure Company label in April 2003, at first under the name Crystal Key II: The Far Realm. It was among a slew of announcements in preparation for the 2003 Electronic Entertainment Expo (E3), and Marek Bronstring of Adventure Gamers called it one of the publisher's "top titles premiering at the show", alongside Traitors Gate II: Cypher. Earthlight Productions developed Crystal Key 2 with Virtools and V-Ray. It was designed to feature spherical 360° panoramas, unlike its predecessor's more limited viewing areas. According to John Matheson, Earthlight sought to overcome the problems that had affected The Crystal Keys production pipeline and give its art team more room "to be as creative as possible".

Initially developed by Earthlight and set for a late-2003 release, Crystal Key 2 underwent "many years" of production and took longer than The Adventure Company had wanted, Benoît Hozjan of Kheops Studio later remarked. As a result, Kheops was hired to co-develop the game late in production, which Hozjan said included "the programming and the integration, hand in hand with John Matheson." In July 2003, Matheson estimated Crystal Key 2 as 75% complete and on track for December, but it ultimately launched in March 2004.

Reception

According to the review aggregation website Metacritic, Crystal Key 2s critical reception was "mixed or average".

References

External links

2004 video games
First-person adventure games
Classic Mac OS games
Crystal Key
The Adventure Company games
DreamCatcher Interactive games
Video games developed in Canada
Video games developed in France
Windows games